Madhogarh is a town and a nagar panchayat in Jalaun district in the Indian state of Uttar Pradesh. Madhogarh is famous for ghee.

List of villages in Madhogarh

 Abdullapur Kanar
 Aheta
 Ajitapur 
 Akbarpura 
 Alampura 
 Amkheda
 Andhai 
 Anghaura 
 Asahana 
 Atagaon
 Atarehati 
 Atrauli 
 Babupura 
 Baghawali 
 Bahadurpur 
 Bahbalpura 
 Bahrai 
 Bangra 
 Barauli 
 Bargawan Madhaugarh 
 Bawali 
 Bera 
 Bhailavli 
 Bham Pura 
 Bhanga 
 Bhaupur 
 Bhitaura 
 Bhojapur 
 Bijduvan 
 Bijuvapur Diwara 
 Bijuvapur Mustakil 
 Bilauha 
 Bilaund 
 Biriya Madhogarh 
 Bohara 
 Bonepura 
 Budhanpura 
 Burhauli 
 Chak Chandawali 
 Chaki 
 Chandawali 
 Chandola 
 Chandpura 
 Chhauna 
 Chhiriya Khurd 
 Chitaura 
 Chitauri 
 Dadanpur 
 Daudpur 
 Dawar Madhogarh 
 Delpura 
 Dhamna 
 Dhamrehi 
 Dharampur Ubari 
 Dharmpurajagir 
 Dhoota 
 Dhunddha Sagar 
 Dikauli Jagir 
 Dikauli Madhogarh 
 Fatehpur Kala 
 Fatehpur Khurd 
 Gaderana Khurd 
 Gaderna 
 Gadrahi 
 Galampura 
 Garhiya 
 Ghilauva 
 Gohan 
 Gohani 
 Gopalpura 
 Gorabhoopaka 
 Gorachiraiya 
 Guplapur Madhogarh 
 Gurha 
 Hadalpura 
 Hafiyapur 
 Hajipur 
 Hamidpur 
 Hamirpura 
 Hanumantpura 
 Harauli 
 Hasupura 
 Himmatpur 
 Hinguta 
 Husepura Jagir 
 Husepura Surai 
 Ikahra 
 Ingai Madhogarh 
 Islampur 
 Ismilepur 
 Itaura Madhogarh 
 Iton 
 Itua Kanar 
 Jagammanpur 
 Jaigha 
 Jaitpura 
 Jajepura 
 Jalalpur 
 Jalaun Khurd 
 Jamalipur 
 Jamlapur Junnardar 
 Jamrehi Avval 
 Jamrehisani 
 Jasuvapur 
 Kailor 
 Kamsera 
 Kanar 
 Kanchanpur 
 Kanhapura 
 Kanharpura 
 Kanjausa 
 Kanjhari 
 Karila 
 Karmara 
 Karra 
 Kasba 
 Kasimpur 
 Kesavapur 
 Khairai 
 Kharagu Pura 
 Kharala 
 Khednkanar 
 Khudadpra 
 Kiruaha 
 Kishunpura 
 Kota Diwara 
 Kota Mustakil 
 Kudari Madhogarh 
 Kulupura 
 Kumrauwan 
 Kunnau 
 Kunvarpura Sihari 
 Kunwarpura Thansingh 
 Kurauli 
 Kurauti 
 Kurepura Kanar 
 Kurra 
 Kursenda 
 Kusepura 
 Kusmara 
 Kuthaunda 
 Kutra 
 Kutubpur 
 Ladpur Diwara 
 Lahudi 
 Lidaupur 
 Lodhipura 
 Lutauli 
 Machkachha 
 Madepura 
 Madnepur Madhogarh 
 Magraol 
 Magraul 
 Maharajpura 
 Mahmoodpur 
 Mahoi 
 Mahoota 
 Mahova 
 Mahpauli 
 Mahtauli 
 Mai 
 Majith 
 Maktaura 
 Malupura 
 Mangadpura 
 Manpura 
 Maragpura 
 Mihauni 
 Mijhauna 
 Mingani 
 Mirzapur 
 Mirzapur Jagir 
 Motipur Diwara 
 Motipur Mustakil 
 Nakelpura 
 Naoli 
 Naraul 
 Nawada 
 Nawar 
 Nichawadi 
 Nimgaon 
 Ninawali Jagir 
 Ninawali Kothi 
 Nivi 
 Niwadi 
 Nyamatpur 
 Ooncha 
 Pachokhara 
 Padkula 
 Parawar 
 Pardani 
 Paren Diwara 
 Paren Mustakil 
 Patiyapur
 Patrahi 
 Pichaura 
 Prithvipura 
 Pura 
 Puranpura 
 Rahawali 
 Rajpura 
 Rajpura Jagir 
 Ramanipur 
 Ramhetpura 
 Rampura 
 Rampura Jalaun 
 Rampura Madhogarh 
 Randhaura 
 Rangpura 
 Rasoolpura 
 Ratanpura 
 Rathauranpura 
 Raura 
 Rawani 
 Rendhar 
 Rithaura 
 Rudaoli Madhogarh 
 Rudawali 
 Rudpura Madhogarh 
 Rupapur 
 Rura Sirsa 
 Salempur Kanar
 Saravan 
 Sarjapura 
 Sarra 
 Sayan Madhogarh 
 Shahbajpur 
 Shekhpur Ahir 
 Siddha Pura 
 Sihari Madhogarh 
 Silauva Bujurg 
 Silauwa Jagir 
 Silli 
 Singaoli 
 Singtauli 
 Sirsadogarhi 
 Sonapur 
 Sonepura 
 Sopta 
 Sultan Pura Jagir 
 Sultanpura 
 Supanunayacha 
 Surawali Madhogarh 
 Surpatpura 
 Tajpura Avval 
 Tihar 
 Tirawali 
 Toar 
 Tolakpur 
 Torna 
 Udotpura Jagir 
 Ugarapura 
 Umari Jagir 
 Umri Madhogarh

Demographics
At the 2001 India census, Madhogarh had a population of 50,071. Males constituted 54% of the population and females 46%. Madhogarh had an average literacy rate of 63%, higher than the national average of 59.5%: male literacy was 71%, and female literacy was 53%.  In Madhogarh, 14% of the population was under 6 years of age. It is 50 km far away from Orai (Jalaun).

References

Cities and towns in Jalaun district